Nilestriol (brand name Wei Ni An; developmental code name LY-49825), also known as nylestriol, is a synthetic estrogen which was patented in 1971 and is marketed in China. It is the 3-cyclopentyl ether of ethinylestriol, and is also known as ethinylestriol cyclopentyl ether (EE3CPE). Nilestriol is a prodrug of ethinylestriol, and is a more potent estrogen in comparison. It is described as a slowly-metabolized, long-acting estrogen and derivative of estriol. Nilestriol was assessed in combination with levonorgestrel for the potential treatment of postmenopausal osteoporosis, but this formulation ultimately was not marketed.

See also
 List of estrogen esters § Ethers of steroidal estrogens

References

Cyclopentyl ethers
Diols
Estranes
Estrogen ethers
Phenols
Prodrugs
Synthetic estrogens
Triols